The Kurmukhi Church of St. George is a Georgian Orthodox Church located in the Qakh District of Azerbaijan. The church is believed to be constructed in 12th century, when the Kingdom of Georgia experienced a political, economical and cultural golden age. its name is first mentioned in Georgian Gospel, which dates back to the fourteenth century, 1310, that notes it under jurisdiction of Georgian Orthodox church. The old church, however was destroyed as a result of Shah Abbas I's invasions of Georgia and was rebuilt only in 1890, by the archimandrite Leonid (then Catholicos-Patriarch of All Georgia). The monastery is currently inactive. 

The Church hosts annual Christian feast of Kurmukhoba, the festival of Saint George at Kurmukhi, which is particularly interesting in that the shrine is visited by both Christians and Muslim Ingiloys.

Gallery

See also
 Leonid of Georgia
 Church of Kish

References

Eastern Orthodox churches in Azerbaijan
12th-century Eastern Orthodox church buildings